Leah Marie Rawls Atkins (born April 24, 1935) is an American historian and former water skiing champion. She served as Director of the Auburn University Center for the Arts and Humanities.

Atkins won the 1953 World water skiing championships in Toronto. After a career in water skiing, she earned a Ph.D. in history from Auburn University in 1974.

Atkins was the first woman in the Alabama Sports Hall of Fame. The Leah Rawls Atkins Award, Auburn University’s highest award for athletics, is named in her honor.

Personal life
In 1954, Atkins married American football player George Atkins.

Publications
Select books:
 A manual for writing Alabama State and local history, 1976
 The romantic ideal : Alabama's plantation eden, 1978
 The valley and the hills : an illustrated history of Birmingham & Jefferson County, 1981
 The Jones family of Huntsville Road, 1981
 An Alabama legacy : images of a state, 1994
 The building of Brasfield & Gorrie, 2002
 "Developed for the service of Alabama" : the centennial history of the Alabama Power Company, 1906-2006, 2006

See also
List of Auburn University people

References 

1935 births
Living people
Auburn University alumni
Auburn University faculty
American women historians
21st-century American historians
21st-century American women writers